Sport in Saudi Arabia is an important part of Saudi Arabian culture and the country participates in many international sporting competitions. Football is a particularly popular sport and Saudi Arabia has won the Asian Cup on three occasions, while other sports such as cricket and basketball are also widely followed. 

In December 2019, the Saudi Arabian Olympic Committee approved the launch of five new sports federations each for hockey, lacrosse, rugby, baseball and softball, thus taking another step towards diversifying the country's sports landscape.

Football 
 
Football is the most popular sport in Saudi Arabia. In recent years, the sport has grown in popularity, and some Saudi players currently play in Europe. The Saudi Arabia national football team is governed by the Saudi Football Federation (SFF). The SFF organises the Saudi leagues, and the Saudi Arabian Cup. The Saudi national team has competed in six FIFA World Cup competitions, in 1994, 1998, 2002, 2006, 2018 and most recently, in 2022. The Saudi team has also competed in seven AFC Asian Cup competitions, first in 1984. Achievements from the AFC Cup include being the Champions in 1984, 1988, and recently, in 1996. The current player of the year is Hussein Sulaimani, who is the captain of Saudi Arabia football team. Saudi Arabia also regularly participate in the Arabian Gulf Cup, AFC Champions League, and Arab Nations Cup. The kingdom is set to host Supercopa de Espana for the first time. However, the response of international fans, especially from Spain, hasn't been too well, with only under 10% of the tickets been sold till now.

Motorsport 
 2004 F1H2O Grand Prix of Saudi Arabia, held in Sunset Beach 
2018 Race of Champions
 2019 F1H2O Grand Prix of Saudi Arabia, the event was also scheduled for 2020 but it was cancelled due to COVID-19 pandemic
Diriyah ePrix 
Dakar Rally (2020-
Saudi Arabian Grand Prix
The race is held at the Riyadh Street Circuit in Diriyah, a town in Saudi Arabia located on the north-western outskirts of the capital, Riyadh. The track is 2.495 km in length and features 21 turns.

Diriyah ePrix

In 2021, Formula One announced they were going to Saudi Arabia for the first time, held in Jeddah across the Red Sea.

Saudi Arabian Grand Prix

Cricket  
Cricket is the second most popular sport in Saudi Arabia, largely due to the increasing number of South Asian expatriates who play the game during their spare time. However, during recent years cricket has generated interest among many Arab locals, such as Faique Habib and Nadim Al Nadwi, who have both represented Saudi Arabia at the national level. Currently there are over 8000 Saudi cricketers, with nearly 20 percent being local Arabs, and the majority of the rest coming from countries such as Pakistan, India and Sri Lanka.

There are many cricket associations Saudi Arabia, with Yanbu Al Sinaiyah Cricket Association being the largest. Each major city has its own organisation which holds its own domestic cup for each format.

Since 2010 Saudi Arabia has gained quite a lot of fame for its style of cricket, as it has won several regional tournaments on turf, even though back home players only play on concrete. Saudi Arabia's biggest win to date was in September 2016, where they beat a Namibian national side by 141 runs. 2 months later they also won their first major series which came in the form of a quadrangular series also involving Kenya, Uganda and Qatar.

Saudi Arabia's greatest cricketer is Shoaib Ali, who has contributed to major victories both home and away, and who has captained the nation since 2008. He is a bowling all rounder who made his debut against Thailand in the 2008 ACC Under-19 Challenge Cup.

According to the official page of Saudi sport Authority, there is no existence of Saudi Cricket Federation, Team or Union.

Basketball

Basketball is also a popular sport in Saudi Arabia. The Saudi Premier League has been home to several players who competed at the FIBA Asia Championship and has also attracted NBA-players such as Mahmoud Abdul-Rauf.

Besides "regular" basketball, 3x3 basketball has become increasingly popular.

Ice hockey 

Ice hockey is also a minor sport but it has not been popular in Saudi Arabia, which has been played its first game in 2010 during the Gulf Ice Hockey Championship.

Professional wrestling 

Professional wrestling has been a recognizable minor sport in Saudi Arabia. The country has hosted one event by the U.S.-based promotion, WWE in Jeddah dubbed the Greatest Royal Rumble on April 27, 2018. The company will host a second event in Riyadh in fall of 2018 as part of the Saudi Vision 2030 plan.

WWE's programming (e.g. WWE Wal3ooha) airs throughout the country on OSN Sports Action 1 and has access to the WWE Network streaming service.

Rugby union

Rugby union in Saudi Arabia is a minor but growing sport, which has been played for several decades in the Kingdom. Many of the local rugby clubs date back to the late 1970s.

National teams 
This is a list of Saudi Arabian national sports teams:
 Saudi Arabia national football team
 Saudi Arabia national basketball team
 Saudi Arabia men's national handball team
 Saudi Arabia national cricket team

Sports Journalism
Al Riyada was the first Sports Newspaper in Saudi Arabia founded by Muhammad Abdullah Malibari.

See also 

 Saudi Arabia at the Olympics
 Saudi Arabia at the Paralympics
 Saudi Arabia Football Federation
 Women's sport in Saudi Arabia
 List of sports venues in Saudi Arabia

References

External links